Hugh Davies (born 1971), is an Australian media arts practitioner, researcher and educator.

While employed at the Australian Broadcasting Corporation, Davies won an Australian Teachers of Media ATOM Award in 2008.

As an academic, he has held lecturing positions at the Adelaide Centre for the Arts, University of South Australia, RMIT and La Trobe University where he managed the Centre for Creative Arts. In 2014, Hugh completed a PhD at Monash University in transmedia gaming.

He has served on the board of the Australian Network for Art and Technology and was inaugural Board Chair of the Freeplay Independent Gaming Festival.

References

External links
 artabase.net
 anat.org.au
 aimia.com.au
 NOMAD
 Freeplay

1971 births
Australian digital artists
Victorian College of the Arts alumni
Living people
Animation educators